Shamsuddin Ahmed may refer to:
 Shamsuddin Ahmed (surgeon) (1920–1971), East Pakistan medical doctor killed in the Bangladesh Liberation war
 Shamsuddin Ahmed (Naogaon-5 MP), Bangladeshi politician
 Shamsuddin Ahmed (Mymensingh-6 MP) (died 2020), Bangladeshi politician